Bang Nam Phueng is a tambon (sub-district) in Phra Pradaeng District, Samut Prakan Province, central Thailand, known for local floating market.

History & toponymy
Its name "Bang Nam Phueng" literally translates to "place of honey". According to the stories of the elders who said that in the past, Bang Nam Phueng was full of perennials and a swarm of bees came to make the honeycomb. Locals therefore popularly offer food to monks with honey, regarded as the highest merit.

Originally, Bang Nam Phueng had a much more spacious area but has divided the area into a new sub-district, Bang Kachao, making it smaller in size.

According to historical evidence make believe that Bang Nam Phueng have at least 200 years of living inhabitants.

Geography
Bang Nam Phueng lies on the banks of the Chao Phraya River, on the oxbow or pork stomach-shaped meander known as Bang Kachao.

The terrain is a lowland along the Chao Phraya River. It is a sedimentary area caused by the deposition of sediments in river and its tributaries. The soil is highly fertile, suitable for making various orchards. It has six natural canals, most of them short canals.

It is bounded by other subdistricts (from the north clockwise): Bang Ko Bua in its district, (across the Chao Phraya River) Phra Khanong Tai in Phra Khanong District and Bang Na Nuea with Bang Na Tai in Bang Na District of Bangkok, Samrong and Bang Krasop with Bang Yo in its district, respectively.

Administration
The entire area of Bang Nam Phueng is governed by Subdistrict Administrative Organization Bang Nam Phueng (SAO Bang Nam Phueng).

The area also consists of 11 administrative muban (village).

Population
Most of the people are central Thais and Mons with some Chinese. People engaged in agriculture employed in industrial factories, private companies, government services and others.

Places
Bang Nam Phueng Floating Market
Wat Bang Nam Phueng Nok
Wat Bang Nam Phueng Nai

Bang Nam Phueng Floating Market 

Bang Nam Phueng Floating Market is in Bang Nam Phueng Subdistrict, Phra Pradaeng District, Samut Prakan Province adjacent to Wat Bang Nam Phueng Nai temple and considered as part of Bang Kachao, a good atmosphere area on bend of the Chao Phraya River. The market was inaugurated in 2004 by the local subdistrict authority to help locals move an oversupply of agricultural products. Its vendors limited to people from the community. The market is on a canal surrounded by a residential neighborhood. Products include commercial crops such as fruits and sweets, noodles, processed food, sea shells, dried shrimp, pickled shrimp, desserts, grain cakes, and fruit.

Local products
Mosquito repellent incense
Water hyacinth handbag
Homemade toilet cleaner
Butterfly pea washing liquid
Nam Dok Mai mango
Cavendish banana

Notes

External links
 
Tambon of Samut Prakan Province
Populated places on the Chao Phraya River